Theodoros Tsirigotis (born 23 June 2000) is a Greek professional footballer who plays as a striker for Super League 2 club AEL, on loan from Levadiakos.

References

2000 births
Living people
Greece youth international footballers
Super League Greece 2 players
Football League (Greece) players
Gamma Ethniki players
Super League Greece players
Episkopi F.C. players
Levadiakos F.C. players
Panathinaikos F.C. B players
Association football forwards
Footballers from Athens
Greek footballers